Guttenadeevi is a village in Dr. B.R. Ambedkar Konaseema district of the Indian state of Andhra Pradesh. It is located in I. Polavaram Mandal of Amalapuram revenue division.

References 

Villages in I. Polavaram mandal